Bell School may refer to:
 Bell Matriculation Higher Secondary School, India
Alexander Graham Bell School (Chicago, Illinois), United States
Bell School, an elementary school in Marblehead Public Schools, Massachusetts, United States

See also

Alexander Graham Bell honors and tributes#Honorary names of schools, organizations, awards, and placenames
Bell Public School, Oklahoma, United States
Bell High School (disambiguation)